Alice Brooks ASC, is an American director of photography best known for her cinematography work on feature films.

Early life
Brooks grew up in Los Angeles and New York, the daughter of Candace Coulston of South Bristol, ME, and Stephen Levi, the late playwright who had numerous plays published by New York publishing company Samuel French. As a child, she acted in various national television commercial spots and was in a recurring skit on Late Night With David Letterman.  Brooks graduated USC School of Cinematic Arts magna cum laude in 2001.

Career
Her work includes In the Heights, the film adaptation of Lin-Manuel Miranda’s Broadway production directed by Jon M. Chu, which received widespread critical acclaim for its cinematography; and Tick, Tick... Boom!, Miranda’s directorial debut starring Andrew Garfield and produced by Ron Howard, based on the stage show by Jonathan Larson.

Brooks collaborates with Chu frequently; prior to In The Heights, the two worked together on The LXD: The Legion of Extraordinary Dancers in 2011, Jem and the Holograms in 2015 and Home Before Dark, Apple TV+’s 2020 crime-drama series. She will work again with Chu on the two-part film adaptation of Stephan Schwartz’s Broadway musical Wicked for Universal. The first part will be released in 2024.

Her work on The Remix: Hip Hop X Fashion from directors Farah X and Lisa Cortes premiered at the 2019 Tribeca Film Festival and went on to win awards from Martha's Vineyard African American Film Festival, Milwaukee Film Festival, Napa Valley Film Festival and the Sidewalk Film Festival. Her work has been featured on the cover of ICG Magazine  Brooks also worked on 2021’s Queen Bees, director Michael Lembeck’s comedy-drama starring Ellen Burstyn, Jane Curtin, Loretta Devine and James Caan.

Accolades
In 2004, Brooks was nominated and awarded WorldFest Houston’s Independent Short Subject-Films & Video - Cinematography - Shorts Platinum Award for her work on Charlie 2.0, Matthew Hsu’s comedy short.

Personal life
She has been married to Samuel Spencer since September 8, 2012.

Filmography

References

External links
 

American cinematographers
USC School of Cinematic Arts alumni
Year of birth missing (living people)
Living people